KELQ 107.9 FM is a radio station broadcasting a news/talk format, simulcasting KELO 1320 AM. Licensed to Flandreau, South Dakota, it serves the Sioux Falls, South Dakota area. The station is currently owned by Duey E. Wright, through licensee Midwest Communications, Inc.

History
On March 1, 2013, KXQL changed their call letters to KELQ and changed their format from oldies (branded as "Kool 107.9") to news/talk, simulcasting KELO 1320 AM.

References

External links

News and talk radio stations in the United States
ELQ
Radio stations established in 2001
Midwest Communications radio stations